Two Rats is an oil painting created in 1884 by Vincent van Gogh.

See also
 List of works by Vincent van Gogh

References

External links 
 

Paintings by Vincent van Gogh
1884 paintings
Mice and rats in art
Rats